Heinrich Christian August Buntzen (29 September 1803, Kiel – 12 January 1892, Ordrup) was a Danish landscape painter.

Biography
His father, Johan Ditlev Buntzen, was a merchant. In 1821, he went to Copenhagen, where he studied at the  Royal Danish Academy of Fine Arts, with Johan Ludwig Lund and Jens Peter Møller. 

His first showing was at an exhibition in Charlottenborg Palace in 1824 and, later, he won several prizes for his landscape paintings. During the 1830s, the academy purchased several of his works, as did the Royal Collection.

In 1833, he married Caroline Birgitte Hansen (1805–1882), the daughter of a "" (someone who makes equipment for sailing ships). They spent most of their married life in a small rural home, just outside of Charlottenlund. 

Much of this time was spent in Italy. He was named a professor in 1863, and was given a lifetime Sødring Endowment in 1868. He was awarded the Order of the Dannebrog in 1877.

Sources
 Biography from the Dansk Biografisk Lexikon @ Project Runeberg
 Biographical notes @ Gravsted
 Biographical data @ the Kunstindeks Danmark

External links 

 More works by Buntzen @ ArtNet

1803 births
1892 deaths
Danish landscape painters
Royal Danish Academy of Fine Arts alumni
Order of the Dannebrog
Artists from Kiel